Iganga District is a district in the Eastern Region of Uganda. The town of Iganga is the site of the district headquarters.

Location
Iganga District is bordered by Kaliro District to the north, Namutumba District to the northeast, Bugweri District to the east, Mayuge District to the south, Jinja District to the southwest, and Luuka District to the west.

Population
In 1991, the national population census estimated the district population at about 235,300. The 2002 national census estimated the population of the district at about 335,500. The annual population growth rate in the district was estimated at 3.5%. In 2012, the population of Iganga District was estimated at approximately 499,600.

Religion 
Iganga District has the highest proportion of Muslims in Uganda.

See also
 Busoga

References

External links
 Kitgum And Iganga Lead In Child Pregnancies — Report

 
Busoga
Districts of Uganda
Eastern Region, Uganda